"Dicknail" is a song by American alternative rock band Hole, written by vocalist/guitarist Courtney Love and lead guitarist Eric Erlandson. The song was released by Sub Pop Records as the band's second single in February 1991 on 7" vinyl. The song was recorded in November 1990 at the band's second studio session, with production by Michael James.

"Dicknail" has been noted for its disturbing lyrics that allude to themes of child molestation, rape and incest. Love referred to the song as an "anti-misogynism anthem". The single's cover artwork features a prepubescent Love lying naked in a bathtub with the band logo superimposed over the photo.

Background and recording
Love and Erlandson are thought to have written "Dicknail" in 1990. The song's first documented performance was at a concert on September 15, 1990, at The Shamrock, a club in Los Angeles.

The first and only known studio version of "Dicknail" was recorded at the band's second studio session in November 1990 at Radio Tokyo in Los Angeles. The song's eventual b-side, "Burn Black", was also recorded at the session, which was produced by Michael James and mixed by Seattle producer Jack Endino. Later mixes of the song — mixed by Barry Goldberg and Erlandson — were released on Hole's 1997 compilation album, My Body, the Hand Grenade.

Composition
In an interview with the Los Angeles fanzine Flipside in 1990, Love and drummer Caroline Rue revealed the meaning behind the song:

The idea of a woman "asking for it" also influenced later work by Hole such as the song "Asking for It" from the band's second album, Live Through This. In this respect, "Dicknail" can be seen to be a forerunner to the song, even though the musical and vocal styles are different, with "Dicknail" being influenced by no wave and punk rock music and "Asking for It" being influenced by more standard alternative rock and powerpop.

In a 1992 interview commenting on the song's overtones of incest and child molestation, Love stated: "The British press [especially] has set me up as someone who lived it, but I think that's really dumb."

All releases of the single list the songwriting credits collectively as Hole, however BMI's website shows that "Dicknail" was written by Courtney Love and Eric Erlandson.

Release 
"Dicknail" was originally released on February 28, 1991, on Sub Pop as a 7" single, although Hole had never signed with the label; many of Hole's contemporaries, however, had also released singles through Sub Pop, including Babes in Toyland and Nirvana.

Although "Dicknail" was Hole's only appearance on Sub Pop, it has nevertheless been reissued as a part of several collections of early Sub Pop music such as Revolution Come and Gone and The Birth of Alternative Vol. 1, alongside songs from contemporaries such as Nirvana and The Afghan Whigs. The B-side, "Burn Black," appears on The Birth of Alternative Vol. 2.

Reception
AllMusic called "Dicknail" "a lumbering, screeching train wreck", adding, "Give Courtney Love credit for tackling the subject of child molestation in such brutal, unflinching detail, but "Dicknail" is so musically abrasive and unpleasant that its message gets lost in translation."

Mike Gunderloy of Factsheet Five gave the single a positive review, calling it: "Gurly rock that makes Madonna look like the cheesecake she really is. Both sides of this single present good, solid riffing with interesting time changes that flows very nicely, despite the appearance of being very damaged rock. If Throwing Muses lived on the west coast, they might have approached this."

Artwork and packaging
First pressings were part of Sub Pop's "Single of the Month" series with grey, light green or pink marble vinyl and wraparound pressings. Later copies were issued with card pressed on green, purple or blue vinyl. The artwork on the front cover of the single features a photograph of a pre-pubescent Courtney Love naked in a bathtub, with the band logo superimposed over it.

Track listing
All songs written by Courtney Love and Eric Erlandson.

US 7" single (SP93)
"Dicknail"3:39
"Burn Black"4:56

Credits and personnel
Hole
Courtney Love – vocals, guitar
Eric Erlandson – guitar
Jill Emery – bass
Caroline Rue – drums, percussion

Production
Michael James – producer, engineer
Jack Endino – mixing

References

External links
Dicknail at AllMusic

Hole (band) songs
1991 singles
Songs with feminist themes
Songs written by Courtney Love
Songs written by Eric Erlandson
1991 songs
Songs about sexual assault